The Olhadoko erreka is a torrential river of the French Basque Country (Pyrénées-Atlantiques), in the Southwest of France, that flows through the Holtzarte Canyon.

After joining the Zurkaitzegiko erreka downstream from Larrau, it forms the Gave de Larrau (the upper course of the Saison).

The Olhadoko erreka is formed at the Olhadoko Dam, from the:
 Bagosudurreko erreka, from Sakhondoa, 
 Zitziratzeko erreka, from Üthürzeheta and Zitziratzea,
 Betzulako erreka from the Betzula valley.
Then it is reinforced by the:
 (R) Ardaneko erreka,
 (L) Uztarbeko erreka,
 (R) Olhadübiko erreka.

References

Rivers of France
Rivers of Pyrénées-Atlantiques
Rivers of Nouvelle-Aquitaine